Roger Mathis (born 9 November 1986) is a Swiss professional footballer who plays for FC Ibach as a defender. He formerly played for FC Lucerne, SC Cham and FC Emmenbrücke.

See also
Football in Switzerland
List of football clubs in Switzerland

References

 

1986 births
Living people
Swiss men's footballers
SC Cham players
FC Luzern players
Association football defenders